The 2001 PBA season was the 27th season of the Philippine Basketball Association (PBA).

Board of governors

Executive committee
 Emilio Bernardino, Jr. (Commissioner) 
 Ignatius Yenko (Chairman, representing Mobiline Phone Pals)
 Francisco Alejo III (Vice-Chairman, representing Purefoods TJ Hotdogs)
 Jose Ma. Concepcion III (Treasurer, representing Pop Cola Panthers)

Teams

Notable occurrences
During the pre-season, Tanduay made soundwaves in the PBA when they dangled Danny Ildefonso of corporate rival San Miguel Beermen a whopping 16-year, 96 million peso offersheet. The league though, nullified the said deal since it was believed that the offersheet violated the team's salary cap.
Danny Ildefonso of San Miguel became the third player to win the Most Valuable Player (MVP) award for two straight seasons, Ildefonso also sets a record by sweeping the season's Best Player of the Conference award, his unprecedented feat started in 2000 when he emerged as the award winner in the Commissioner's and Governors' Cups, his BPC wins surpassed the three apiece won by Vergel Meneses and Alvin Patrimonio.
Purefoods' Alvin Patrimonio became the first player to suit up for 500 straight games
Alaska import Sean Chambers hung up his number 20 jersey after 13 years in a highly emotional retirement ceremony.
The corporate sale of Purefoods, including its PBA franchise, to San Miguel Corporation at the end of the year was eventually approved by the Board of Governors, the Hotdogs became the third team under the San Miguel corporate umbrella. 
Paul Asi Taulava and Eric Menk, two fil-foreign players, returned to their respective ballclubs, Taulava reunited with the Phone Pals around mid-year while Menk suited up for Tanduay a little later.
In a stunning move in late December, Tanduay shipped Eric Menk, Dondon Hontiveros, Bonel Balingit and Chris Cantonjos to other teams as a prelude to Tanduay's subsequent sale of its franchise to FedEx, the delivery firm, for P 75 million.

Opening ceremonies
The muses for the participating teams are as follows:

2001 PBA All-Filipino Cup

Elimination round

Playoffs

Finals 

|}

2001 PBA Commissioner's Cup

Elimination round

Playoffs

Finals 

|}

2001 PBA Governors' Cup

Elimination round

Playoffs

Finals 

|}

Awards
 Most Valuable Player: Danny Ildefonso (San Miguel)
 Rookie of the Year:  Mark Caguioa (Barangay Ginebra)
 Sportsmanship Award: Rey Evangelista (Purefoods)
 Most Improved Player: Noy Castillo (Purefoods)
 Defensive Player of the Year: Chris Jackson (Shell)
 Mythical Five
 Danny Ildefonso (San Miguel)
 Danny Seigle (San Miguel)
 Olsen Racela (San Miguel)
 Dennis Espino (Sta. Lucia)
 Ali Peek (Alaska)
 Mythical Second Team
 Noy Castillo (Purefoods)
 Kenneth Duremdes (Alaska)
 Nic Belasco (San Miguel)
 Rudy Hatfield (Pop Cola)
 Davonn Harp (Red Bull)
 All Defensive Team
 Chris Jackson (Shell)
 Dennis Espino (Sta. Lucia)
 Marlou Aquino (Sta. Lucia)
 Rey Evangelista (Purefoods) 
 Patrick Fran (Mobiline/Talk 'N Text)

Awards given by the PBA Press Corps
 Coach of the Year: Yeng Guiao (Red Bull)
 Mr. Quality Minutes: Mark Caguioa (Barangay Ginebra)
 Executive of the Year: Sonny Barios (PBA executive director)
 Referee of the Year: Ernie de Leon

Cumulative standings

References

External links
 pba.inquirer.net

 
PBA